Tattenhall railway station was a railway station in the village of Tattenhall, Cheshire on the Whitchurch and Tattenhall Railway or Chester-Whitchurch Branch Line, about a mile to the south of Tattenhall junction where the branch line diverged from the North Wales Coast Line running from Chester in the north-west towards Crewe to the south-east.

History
The station was closed in 1957, and the name Tattenhall was transferred to the nearby Tattenhall Road station on the Chester–Crewe line.  That station subsequently also closed, in 1966.

Services

References

Further reading

External links
 Tattenhall station on Subterranea Britannica

Disused railway stations in Cheshire
Former London and North Western Railway stations
Railway stations in Great Britain opened in 1872
Railway stations in Great Britain closed in 1957